Duke of Franco was a hereditary  title in the Spanish nobility. The title was created in 1975 by King Juan Carlos I and bestowed upon Carmen Franco, the daughter and only child of Spain's Caudillo, General Francisco Franco. Together with the dukedom, she received a coat of arms of new creation. These arms are a variation of the arms of Andrade family of Galicia, from whom Franco was descended through females. A Grandeeship was attached to the title.

History 
In 1950, Carmen Franco, 1st Duchess of Franco, had married Cristóbal Martínez-Bordiú, 10th Marquess of Villaverde, by whom she had several children. Dukes and duchesses of Franco are also Grandees of Spain. After the death of the 1st Duchess of Franco, succession of the ducal title with accompanying dignity has been requested by her eldest daughter María del Carmen Martínez-Bordiú y Franco.  Under Spanish nobiliary law, her eldest daughter Maria is first in line, but does not succeed automatically; with the application to the Crown and the issue of the Royal Letter of Succession, and after an announcement period of thirty days, succession only legally enters into force after a tax is paid.

In 2018, the far-left Izquierda Unida party sent a letter to King Felipe VI asking that title of Duke or Duchess of Franco be repressed as a violation of Spain's Historical Memory Law but the power to make or unmake nobility resides solely in the Spanish monarch and is not covered by that law. The Dukedom was granted to the heir apparent, María del Carmen Martínez-Bordíu y Franco, the eldest daughter of the late Duchess, on the same year, as published in the Official State Gazette on 4 July 2018.

The title was abolished on 21 October 2022, under the purview of the Law of Democratic Memory.

Dukes of Franco (1975–2022)
 María del Carmen Franco y Polo, 1st Duchess of Franco (1975–2017)
 María del Carmen Martínez-Bordiú y Franco, 2nd Duchess of Franco (2018–2022)

See also
 Lord of Meirás
 List of dukes in the peerage of Spain

References

 
Franco
Francoist Spain
Noble titles created in 1975
Grandees of Spain
1975 establishments in Spain
2022 disestablishments in Spain